Deewaar is a 1975 Indian film.

Deewaar or Deewar may also refer to:

Deewaar: Let's Bring Our Heroes Home, a 2004 Indian film
Deewar (TV series), an Indian television show on TV Asia

See also 
 Dewar (disambiguation)